Radhika Balakrishnan (born in Ootacamund, India) is the faculty director of the Center for Women's Global Leadership at Rutgers University. Currently, she serves as the Chair of the Board of the United States Human Rights Network and Chair on the Board of the Center for Constitutional Rights, Commissioner for the Commission for Gender Equity for the City of New York, and President of the International Association for Feminist Economics (IAFFE) for 2020-2021.

Biography
Radhika Balakrishnan grew up in Tamil Nadu, India and moved to Chicago, Illinois when she was 13 years old. She attended the University of Illinois at Urbana–Champaign initially to study engineering, but switched majors and graduated in 1980 with a Bachelor of Arts in Economics. It was at the University of Illinois that Balakrishnan first became involved in the women's movement, which inspired her to study economics. In 1985 she received her Master of Arts in Economics, and in 1990 she received her Ph.D. in Economics, both from Rutgers University.

Career
From 1992 to 1995, Radhika Balakrishnan worked at the Ford Foundation as a program officer in the Asian Regional Program.  From 2003 to 2009, she was a professor at Marymount Manhattan College where she taught economics and international studies   In September 2009, she joined Rutgers University as a professor of Women's and Gender Studies and the executive director of the Center for Women's Global Leadership, where she focused on issues of economics and social justice from a feminist perspective as they relate to macroeconomic policy, especially in health and education. Radhika Balakrishnan now serves as the faculty director of the Center.

Interviews
"More Women Peacekeepers Is Not the Solution" Cléo Fatoorehchi interviews RADHIKA BALAKRISHNAN of the Centre for Women's Global Leadership. Inter Press Service, December 2010.
16 Days of Activism: Spotlight on Militarism.  Global Fund for Women, November 2010.
Interview with Radika Balakrishnan on Huffington Post Article Why Human Rights are Indispensable to Financial Regulation.  Law and Order Radio, Pacific Radio, April 2010.
 NGLS Interviews Radhika Balakrishnan, Executive Director, Center for Women’s Global Leadership.  UN Non-Governmental Liaison Service (UN NGLS), January 2010.
Experts Comment on Rights in Times of Economic Crisis.  Center for Economic and Social Rights, November 2009.

Research and Publications
Radhika Balakrishnan's primary research interests are gender and development, human rights and the global economy, and human rights and economic social rights.

Balakrishnan's publications include:

Books

Recent articles and book chapters
 
 
 
 
 
 
 Balakrishnan, Radhika; Sayeed, Asad (2004), "Why do firms disintegrate? Towards an understanding of the firm-level decision to subcontract and its implication for labor", in

References

External links
From Classrooms to Centre Stage: A Professor Who Speaks for Women
"More Women Peacekeepers Is Not the Solution" Cléo Fatoorehchi interviews RADHIKA BALAKRISHNAN of the Centre for Women's Global Leadership
16 Days of Activism: Spotlight on Militarism
Interview with Radika Balakrishnan on Huffington Post Article Why Human Rights are Indispensable to Financial Regulation
 NGLS Interviews Radhika Balakrishnan, Executive Director, Center for Women’s Global Leadership
Radhika Balakrishnan's Biography on the CWGL Website
Radhika Balakrishnan's Publications
Radhika Balakrishnan's Articles, Statements, and Interviews

1959 births
Living people
Indian women's rights activists
University of Illinois Urbana-Champaign alumni
Rutgers University faculty
People from Chicago
Indian emigrants to the United States